Albert Thomas Frederick Denyer (6 December 1924 – December 2015) was an English professional footballer who played as an outside forward in the Football League for Swindon Town.

Personal life 
Denyer's father Bertie was also a footballer for Swindon Town.

Career statistics

References

Sportspeople from Swindon
English footballers
Swindon Town F.C. players
English Football League players
1924 births
2015 deaths
Association football outside forwards
Cardiff City F.C. players